Hluchý (Czech feminine: Hluchá) is a surname. Notable people with the surname include:

 Kateřina Hluchá (born 1975), Czech sprint canoer
 Milan Hluchý (born 1985), Czech ice hockey player

Czech-language surnames